Operation Omaid (Dari for Hope) was a planned 2010 military operation by international and Afghan forces to secure the southern city of Kandahar and push back the Taliban.  It would have come in the wake of the coalition offensive in Helmand Province focused on Marja, codenamed Operation Moshtarak.  According to a Taliban spokesperson, a series of deadly bombings in Kandahar on March 13 was carried out in response to the announcement of the impending operation.

References

Military operations of the War in Afghanistan (2001–2021) involving the United States